Nurmagomed Murtazalievich Gadzhiyev (born 9 January 1996 in Dagestan) is a Russian freestyle wrestler of Avar descent, who represents Azerbaijan in the light heavyweight division (97 kg). Two-time European championships wrestling bronze medallist. He is a silver medalist of the second European Games in men's freestyle in 97 kg

In 2020, he was declared wanted by Russian Ministry of Internal Affairs on suspicion of murder.

References

1996 births
Living people
Russian male sport wrestlers
Avar people
People from Dagestan
Russian people of Dagestani descent
Wrestlers at the 2019 European Games
European Games medalists in wrestling
European Games silver medalists for Azerbaijan
Sportspeople from Dagestan